Ramisia is a monotypic genus of flowering plants belonging to the family Nyctaginaceae. The only species is Ramisia brasiliensis.

Its native range is Eastern Brazil.

References

Nyctaginaceae
Monotypic Caryophyllales genera